The Lebanese Second Division is the second division of Lebanese football. It is controlled by the Federation Libanaise de Football Association. The top two teams qualify for the Lebanese Premier League and replace the relegated teams, while the bottom two are relegated to the Lebanese Third Division.

Nahda Barelias and Shabab El Bourj were promoted from the Third Division, while Al Shabab Al Arabi and Al Islah were relegated from the Lebanese Premier League in 2017–18.

Teams

League table

References 

2018–19 in Lebanese football
Lebanese Second Division seasons
Lebanon